Bushmaster may refer to:

Snakes
 Any member of the genus Lachesis (genus), large venomous pit vipers of Central and South America

Military and firearms
 Bushmaster Firearms International, an American firearms manufacturer
 Bushmaster Arm Pistol, a 5.56×45mm NATO weapon classified as either a long pistol or short rifle
 Bushmaster M17S, a semi-automatic bullpup rifle
 Bushmaster ACR, an assault rifle originally designed by Magpul
 Bushmaster XM-15, a line of AR-15 pattern rifles and carbines
 Bushmaster M4-type Carbine, a carbine in the XM-15 family
 .450 Bushmaster, a rifle cartridge originally developed by LeMAG Firearms LLC
 Bushmaster Protected Mobility Vehicle, an Australian infantry mobility vehicle
 During World War II, the 158th Infantry Regiment of the Arizona Army National Guard were nicknamed the "Bushmasters"
 A variant of the Landing Vehicle Tracked (LVT)
 M242 Bushmaster, a 25mm chain gun manufactured by Alliant Techsystems
 Mk44 Bushmaster II, a 30mm chain gun derived from the M242
 Bushmaster III, a 35mm chain gun derived from the M242
 Bushmaster IV, a 40mm chain gun derived from the M242

Entertainment
 Bushmaster (DC Comics),  the name of a fictional DC Comics superhero
 Bushmaster (Marvel Comics),  the codename for two Marvel Comics super-villains

Aircraft 
 Stout Bushmaster 2000 (a development of the Ford Trimotor), a small commuter airliner
 a modified Piper PA-22 Tri-Pacer airplane with lengthened wings, fuselage and more powerful engine

See also
 Bushmasters (disambiguation)